Cut-throat, cutthroat or cut throat or their plurals may refer to:

A murderer; one who performs the unlawful killing, with malice aforethought, of another human
Cut throat competition, for example a price race that drives competitors out of the market

Nature 
Cutthroat eel, a family, Synaphobranchidae, of eels found worldwide in temperate and tropical seas
Cutthroat trout, a species of freshwater fish in the salmon family of order Salmoniformes
Cut-throat finch, a common species of estrildid finch found in Africa
An alternative name for the rose-breasted grosbeak

Geography
Cutthroat Lake, a lake in Utah
Cut Throat City, a region of New Orleans, Louisiana
Cutthroat Gap, site of Cutthroat Gap Massacre, an 1833 massacre in the Wichita Mountains

Books 
 Cutthroat (comics), a comic book character, a supervillain in Marvel Comics' main shared universe
 Cutthroat (novel), a novel in the Special X series by Michael Slade
 The Cutthroat, a novel in the Isaac Bell series by Clive Cussler
 The Cut-throat Celts, a book in the Horrible Histories series published by Scholastic

Film 
Cain's Cutthroats, a 1971 western-themed exploitation film
Cutthroat Island, a 1995 pirate-themed action film
The Cut-Throats, a 1969 film directed by John Hayes
Cutthroats, 1994 film by Michael Legge

Television 
The Challenge: Cutthroat, season 20 of the MTV reality game show
"Cut Throat" (The Shield), a season 4 episode of The Shield
Cutthroat Kitchen, a cooking show on Food Network
Cutthroat (Transformers), a fictional Transformers character

Music 
The Cutthroats 9, a band
"Cut Throat", a song by Kittie from their 2009 album In the Black
"Cut-Throat", a song by Sepultura from their 1996 album Roots
"Cut Throat", a song by Death Grips from their 2011 mixtape Exmilitary
"Cutthroat", a song by Imagine Dragons from their 2021 album, Mercury – Act 1
Operation: Cut-Throat, Hidden in Plain View's second EP

Games
Cutthroats (video game), a 1984 computer game
Cutthroat: The Shadow Wars, a fantasy RPG

Cutthroat (pool), a three-player pocket billiards game

Other uses 
Denver Cutthroats, a minor league ice hockey team from Denver, Colorado
Cut-Throat DDT, a wrestling move
Castner's Cutthroats, Alaskan U.S. Army irregulars who helped defeat the Japanese in the World War II Battle of the Aleutian Islands
Cut-throat razor, a reusable knife blade used for shaving hair

Animal common name disambiguation pages